The Santa Rosa County Sheriff's Office (SRSO) is the primary law enforcement agency of Santa Rosa County, Florida. Both the cities of Gulf Breeze and Milton operates their own LEOs (law enforcement organization); however, the sheriff's office operates the majority of law enforcement operations within Milton. SRSO is headed by a sheriff, who serves a four-year term and is elected in a partisan primary election.

Offices & facilities
The main offices are in Milton. District offices are located in Gulf Breeze,  Navarre, Pace, Milton, and Jay.

Administration
Sheriff
Current Sheriff: Bob Johnson. 
Sheriff Bob Johnson has been employed with SRSO since 1993. He was elected as Sheriff in 1996 and sworn in on January 3, 2017.  He is a longstanding member of the county's SWAT Team and formerly held the post of SWAT Team Commander. During his employment with the agency Bob has been the member of the following units: Major Crimes Detective, Narcotics Supervisor, D.A.R.E School Resource Officer, Juvenile Unit Supervisor, Patrol Corporal, Patrol Sergeant, Evening Shift Watch Commander, Navarre District Commander, Internal Affairs, Administrative Captain, Criminal Investigations Division Commander, Fleet Operations and Public Information Officer.

Chief Deputy
Current Chief Deputy Sheriff: Joe McCurdy
Joe McCurdy was appointed as Chief Deputy Sheriff on June 9, 2018.

Command Staff:
Assistant Chief Shane Tucker,
Colonel Randy Tifft,
Major Chris Watson,
Major Douglas Bringmans

Administration Staff:

Patrol Division: Captain Jason Erlemann 
Investigative Division: Captain Blevin Davis/Lieutenant Scott Jones
Professional Standards: Captain Wayne Enterkin
Administration: Captain Scott Haines
Public Information Officer: Sgt. Rich Aloy

District Field Offices:

District One - Gulf Breeze Area: 
District Two - Navarre Area: 
District Three - Pace Area:
District Four - East Milton Area: 
District Five - Jay Area :

SRSO Units (in abc order)

- Court Security
- Crime Analysis
- Crime Scene
- Field Training
- Honor Guard
- K-9 Unit
- Major Crimes
- Marine / Dive
- Media Relations
- Narcotics
- SWAT
- Traffic

Rank structure

Services Provided for Citizens
Citizens' Law Enforcement Academy
 Volunteer Program 
 Civilian Observer ( please see website for requirements )
 Citizen's Firearm Safety
 Crime prevention strategies
 Crime Stoppers
 Victim Assistance Program
 Explorer Program 
  Fingerprint services
  "Know The Law" booklet 
  ID Theft booklet

History

List of SRSO Sheriffs

William Washington Harrison 1845-1849
James R. Mims 1849-1851
Isaiah Cobb, Jr. 1851-1855, 1860-1861
James C. McArthur 1855-1859
James Milton Amos 1861-1863
John L. McLellan 1863-1865
Abraham.B. Dixon 1865-1867
John W. Butler 1874-1878
Wiliam Adam C. Benbow 1878-1881
William Jackson 1881-1893
John Houston Collins 1893-1897, 1909-1913
David Mitchell 1897-1909
John H. Harvell 1913-1921
Henry Clay Mitchell 1921-1933
Joseph T. Allen Sr. 1933-1945
Marshall Rufus Hayes 1945-1957
Bart Dell Broxson 1957-1959
Annie Rachel Gordon Broxson 1959-1959
John Ray Broxson 1959-1961
Wade H. Cobb Sr. 1961-1968
Leon Hinote Jr. 1968-1972
Harvell Enfinger 1972-1981
James A. Powell Sr. 1981-1985
Elwyn Mauriece Coffman Jr. 1985-1992
James F. Coats 1992-1992
Jerry D. Brown 1992-2000
Wendell Hall 2000–2016
Bob Johnson 2016–Present

Television
The sheriff's office has a television show, hosted by Sheriff Johnson and Sgt. Rich Aloy on Blab TV, entitled "INSIDE SRSO". It is broadcast on Blab TV (Cox Channel 1006).

Postcard-only policy 
In 2010, Sheriff Wendell Hall instituted a policy that prohibited inmates from sending mail in enclosed envelopes, with the exception of privileged and legal mail. All regular correspondence was required to be done by postcard. An inmate at the jail named Marcie Hamilton filed suit against the sheriff on behalf of the class of inmates at the jail, arguing the policy violated their rights under the First and Fourteenth Amendments to the US Constitution. The Sheriff rescinded this policy just before the suit went to trial, and the parties settled in February 2012.

References

Notes

External links
 
 

Sheriffs' departments of Florida
Santa Rosa County, Florida
Navarre, Florida